Dolichoderus kohlsi is an extinct species of Middle Eocene of ant in the genus Dolichoderus. Described by Dlussky and Rasnitsyn in 2002, the fossils were discovered in the United States.

References

†
Eocene insects
Fossil taxa described in 2002
†
Fossil ant taxa